Gorries may refer to:

Paul Gorries (born 1981), South African sprinter
Gorries, nickname of the Orthodox Mennonites